The Church of the Sacred Heart Parish, also known as Sacred Heart Parish of New Bohemia is a Catholic church in Petersburg, Virginia that was built in 1906.  It was originally constructed to serve the needs of the Czech and Slovak immigrant population that settled in the New Bohemia area.  The success of the church later attracted immigrants from other Eastern European countries such as Lithuania, Poland, and Ukraine.

History of the Parish 
Following the death of her husband Matiej in 1904, Marie Hanzlik donated their land to the Bishop of the Diocese of Richmond, and in 1906, the first church was built there. The church was dedicated to the patron saint of the Czech community, St. Wenceslas. In 1908, a Parish Hall was completed to support community and parish needs. In 1952, the second church was built, and is still currently in use as the church commons, with the altar having been closed off and repurposed as a small chapel. In 1954, the first church was demolished, and later in 1962, a rectory for the Priest was erected at that site. In 2006, for the 100th anniversary of Sacred Heart Parish, a third structure was built onto the second building, which currently serves as the primary place of worship.

The church was listed on the National Register of Historic Places on February 8, 2012.

References

External links
Official Church website

Churches in Prince George County, Virginia
Czech-American culture in Virginia
Gothic Revival church buildings in Virginia
Lithuanian-American culture
National Register of Historic Places in Prince George County, Virginia
Churches on the National Register of Historic Places in Virginia
Roman Catholic churches completed in 1906
Churches in the Roman Catholic Diocese of Richmond
Polish-American culture in Virginia
Slovak-American culture in Virginia
Ukrainian-American culture
1906 establishments in Virginia
20th-century Roman Catholic church buildings in the United States